Anil Kumar (born 12 December 1984) is an Indian judoka.

Achievements

References

External links
 
 2006 Asian Games profile

1984 births
Living people
Indian male judoka
Judoka at the 2006 Asian Games
Asian Games competitors for India
Indian male martial artists
Place of birth missing (living people)
21st-century Indian people